Gabriele Vianello (born 6 May 1938) is a retired Italian professional basketball player. In 2011, he was inducted into the Italian Basketball Hall of Fame.

Professional career
Vianello was a member of the FIBA European Selection, in 1964.

National team career
Vianello was a part of the senior Italian national basketball teams that finished fourth, fifth, and eighth, at the 1960 Summer Olympics, the 1964 Summer Olympics, and the 1968 Summer Olympics, respectively.

References

External links

FIBA Profile
FIBA Europe Profile
Italian League Profile 

1938 births
Living people
Basketball players at the 1960 Summer Olympics
Basketball players at the 1964 Summer Olympics
Basketball players at the 1968 Summer Olympics
Olympic basketball players of Italy
Olimpia Milano players
Pallacanestro Varese players
Reyer Venezia players
Small forwards
Italian men's basketball players
1963 FIBA World Championship players